The sergeant at arms of the United States House of Representatives is an officer of the House with law enforcement, protocol, and administrative responsibilities. The sergeant at arms is elected at the beginning of each Congress by the membership of the House.

Duties

In one of its first resolutions, the 1st United States Congress (April 14, 1789) established the role of Sergeant at Arms of the United States House of Representatives.

Security 
As the chief law enforcement officer of the House, the sergeant at arms is responsible for security in the House wing of the United States Capitol, the House office buildings, and on adjacent grounds. Under the direction of the speaker of the House or other presiding officer, the sergeant at arms plays an integral role in maintaining order and decorum in the House chamber.

The sergeant at arms is also responsible for ensuring the safety and security of members of Congress, the congressional staff, visiting dignitaries, and tourists. Toward this end, the sergeant at arms works in concert with the Senate sergeant at arms and the Architect of the Capitol. These three officials, along with the chief of the Capitol Police ex officio, comprise the Capitol Police Board.

In 2015, at a House committee hearing chaired by Candice Miller, then House Sergeant at Arms Paul D. Irving said that he gave considerable time to ensuring House members' safety and their staff, and visitors to the House, including threat and intelligence monitoring and analysis by reviewing threats and intelligence directed to House members. He said that he monitored events at the Capitol complex, such as demonstration activity, committee hearings, head of state visits, and major events taking place on the complex. He said that on a daily basis, he dealt with the Senate sergeant at arms about security for the Capitol complex.

Protocol and ceremony 

Through custom and precedent, the sergeant at arms performs a number of protocol and ceremonial duties. These duties include leading formal processions at ceremonies such as presidential inaugurations, joint sessions of Congress (such as the State of the Union address, prior to 2007), formal addresses to the Congress, greeting and escorting visiting foreign dignitaries, conveying articles of impeachment from the House to the Senate, and to supervise congressional funeral arrangements. In this capacity, the sergeant at arms is most famous for announcing the arrival of the president, a responsibility that he took over from the doorkeeper of the United States House of Representatives when the latter position was abolished in 1995. Custom dictates that he announce the arrival of the Supreme Court, the president's cabinet, and finally the president by proclaiming, "Madam (or Mister) Speaker, the President of the United States!"

Unruliness 
For daily sessions of the House, the sergeant at arms carries the silver and ebony mace of the United States House of Representatives in front of the speaker in procession to the rostrum. When the House is in session, the mace stands on a pedestal to the speaker's own right. When the body resolves itself into a Committee of the Whole House on the State of the Union, the sergeant at arms moves the mace to a lowered position, more or less out of sight. In accordance with the Rules of the House, on the rare occasions when a member becomes unruly, the sergeant at arms, on order of the speaker, lifts the mace from its pedestal and presents it before the offenders, thereby restoring order.

Other 
The sergeant at arms also performs administrative services in support of the members, staff, and visitors associated with the security and other operations of the House.

If a quorum is not present, those representatives who are present may vote to order the sergeant at arms to try to round up absent representatives.

In addition to serving on the Capitol Police Board, the sergeant at arms served with the Senate sergeant at arms and the Architect of the Capitol on the Capitol Guide Board. This board oversaw the Capitol Guide Service, which provided tours of the Capitol to visitors and special services to tourists.

Deputy sergeants at arms
The deputy sergeants at arms act as assistants to the sergeant at arms. The sergeant at arms has the duty of making the important decisions under his/her power, while the deputy sergeant at arms often executes the decisions. The deputy sergeant at arms that served under Paul Irving was Timothy Blodgett.

List of sergeants at arms

See also
Sergeant at Arms of the United States Senate
Serjeant-at-arms

References

External links
 
 Source: United States House of Representatives Sergeant at Arms Fact Sheet (pdf file), via House.gov
Sergeants at Arms official fact sheet, via history.house.gov

1789 establishments in the United States